Bernard Gorcey  (9 January 1886 – 11 September 1955) was a Russian-born American actor.  He began in Vaudeville, performed on Broadway, and appeared in multiple shorts and films.  He portrayed ice cream shop proprietor Louie Dumbrowski in Monogram Pictures' The Bowery Boys series of B movies.

Career

Stage
Early in his career Gorcey found success in comedy roles.  Between 1907 and 1937 he played in several stage productions, including Tom Jones (1912), What Ails You? (1918), Somebody's Sweetheart (1920) (as "A Mysterious Conspirator"), Always You (1922) (as "Isaac Cohen"), Abie's Irish Rose (1923), Wildflower (1925) (as "Gaston La Roche"), Song of the Flame (1927) (as “Count Boris”), Cherry Blossoms (1930) (as "George Washington Goto"), Pressing Business (1931), Joy of Living (1931), Wonder Boy (1932) (as "Commodore Cohen"), Keeping Expenses Down (1935) (as "Kent J. Goldstein"), Creeping Fire (1935) (as "Mr. Goodman"), and Satellite (1937) (as "Max Goldblatz").

The most successful show of Gorcey’s theatrical career was Abie’s Irish Rose.

Radio and film
He also performed some radio work for the Popeye Show. At 42 years old, he began working in movies. From 1928 until 1955, he appeared in 67 movies, with minor roles with both Monogram and Warner Bros.

Forty-four of these were with sons Leo and David in The East Side Kids and The Bowery Boys film series. Between 1946 and 1955, there were between four and five Bowery Boys movies annually, with Bernard playing the role of Louie Dumbrowski, the owner of a sweet shop where the Bowery Boys would hang out, usually getting free sodas while planning their next escapade, much to Dumbrowski's displeasure. He also appeared as Charlie Chaplin's meek Jewish neighbor Mr. Mann in the film classic The Great Dictator (1940).

Personal life
Gorcey married Josephine Condon (1897-1975) in 1914 and had 2 sons, Leo and David, and a daughter.

On 31 August 1955, he crashed his car into a bus on 4th & LaBrea Avenue in Los Angeles.  He died from his injuries on 11 September.

Filmography

References

External links

1886 births
1955 deaths
American male radio actors
American male film actors
Vaudeville performers
Emigrants from the Russian Empire to the United States
Road incident deaths in California